Northern States Life Insurance Company is a historic office building located at Hammond, Lake County, Indiana.  It was built in 1926, and is a two-story, Classical Revival style limestone building on a partially exposed basement.  It features an elevated terrace, engaged columns, and sculptural panels with low relief carvings.  The Northern States Life Insurance Company ceased operation in 1930, and the building subsequently housed radio station WWAE (1938-1940), a branch library (1945-1965), Purdue University extension service (1943-1946), Hammond school administrative offices (1946-1984), and school.

It was listed in the National Register of Historic Places in 2010.

References

Hammond, Indiana
Office buildings on the National Register of Historic Places in Indiana
Neoclassical architecture in Indiana
Commercial buildings completed in 1926
Buildings and structures in Lake County, Indiana
National Register of Historic Places in Lake County, Indiana